Sainikudu is a 2006 Indian Telugu-language political action drama film written and directed by Gunasekhar, with music composed by Harris Jayaraj. It stars Mahesh Babu and Trisha. Irrfan Khan, in his only South Indian film, plays the antagonist, and Prakash Raj, Kota Srinivasa Rao, Telangana Shakuntala, and Ajay play supporting roles. Balasubramaniem handled the camera work while Sreekar Prasad handled the editing. Sainikudu was released on 30 November 2006  and the music was released on 21 October 2006. It was partially reshot in Tamil as  Kumaran  with a comedy track involving Vadivelu, Vennira Aadai Moorthy and Singamuthu. Made on a budget of 25 crore, the film was a major flop at the box office.

Plot
The story starts with floods at Ranga Saipet in Warangal District. Houses, trains, and people inundate in floodwater. A young man named Siddharth and his friends save the people up to their maximum effort. Eight of his friends assist him in the rescue.

On the other hand, the Chief Minister recommends the candidature of Parakala Pappu Yadav for Assembly Elections. Pappu Yadav is a goon who wishes to earn big through politics and power. To get the attention of people, he announces a sum of Rs. 5 crore for flood victims.

The food that needs to reach the victims of the flood is taken elsewhere to be sold, an illegal way of earning money and backing up the flood relief fund into the pockets of the politicians. Siddharth learns of this through one of his friends and saves the stock in time. He then takes it to the flood victims for distribution. This annoys Pappu Yadav, for which Mondi Nani, his right-hand, threatens Siddharth. A strife develops between Mondi Nani and Siddharth, and the latter declares that his friend Ajay Kumar will be contesting the next Assembly Election opposite Pappu Yadav. Siddharth and his team get accolades from the people for this decision and start campaigning.

To cut the good name of the group in the people and to win sympathy, Pappu Yadav conspires for a bomb blast allegation on Siddharth and his team. Mondi Nani works for him and the mission is accomplished. Pappu Yadav declares Siddharth and his team as terrorists. He wins the election, becomes the Home Minister, and his marriage is settled with Varalakshmi. Siddharth, with the help of many college students, kidnaps Varalakshmi from the marriage hall, demanding that Pappu Yadav state his crimes before a court of law. Varalakshmi is handcuffed and gagged with tape.

The rest of the film shows Pappu Yadav chasing Siddharth to get Varalakshmi back while Siddharth and Varalakshmi fall in love while she is held captive and how Siddharth puts an end to the game of crooked politicians.

Cast

 Mahesh Babu as Siddharth 
 Irrfan Khan as Parakala Purushottam Yadav aka Pappu Yadav
 Trisha as Varalakshmi
 Prakash Raj as J. Venkat Rao aka Mondi Naani
 Kota Srinivasa Rao as Chief Minister
 Adarsh Balakrishna as Vanchiraj
 Telangana Shakuntala as ACP Pochamma
 Ajay as Ajay Kumar
 Ravi Varma as Ravi
 Ravi Prakash as Siva
 Narsing Yadav as Pappu Yadav's lawyer
 Paruchuri Venkateswara Rao
 Kondavalasa Lakshmana Rao
 Raghunatha Reddy
 Duvvasi Mohan
 Kamna Jethmalani in an item number

Tamil version
 Vadivelu as Hotel Server 
 Vennira Aadai Moorthy as Hotel Owner 
 Singamuthu as Hotel Guest
 Omakuchi Narasimhan as Hotel Guest

Awards
 2006 - Nandi Award for Best Special Effects - Rana

Music
Sainikudu has six songs composed by Harris Jayaraj. The music was released simultaneously in 10 venues from five countries – India, USA, Australia, Singapore and Dubai on the morning of 21 October 2006. The producer of the film, Ashwini Dutt, arranged the use of a satellite transmission to relay the live audio release across the globe. The music proved to be extremely successful upon release. The song "Go Go Go Adhigo" is based on "Smooth Criminal" by Michael Jackson, from his 1987 Album "Bad". The song "Orugalluke Pilla" is based on "Chaiyya Chaiyya" by A. R. Rahman, from the 1998 Movie "Dil Se"

References

External links
 

2006 films
Films shot in Warangal
2000s Telugu-language films
Films directed by Gunasekhar
Indian action films
Political action films
Films scored by Harris Jayaraj
2006 action films